Benjamin Bradley may refer to:

Benjamin Bradley (inventor) (1830–1904), American inventor
Benjamin Franklin Bradley (1825–1897), politician in the Confederate States of America
Benjamin Francis Bradley (1898–1957), British communist union leader
Ben Bradley (politician) (born 1989), British Conservative Party politician
Ben Bradley (Hollyoaks), a fictional character from the British soap Hollyoaks
Ben Bradley (philosopher) (born 1971), American philosopher

See also
 Ben Bradlee (1921–2014), Washington Post editor
 Ben Bradlee Jr. (born 1948), Boston Globe journalist and editor, son of Ben Bradlee
 Benjamin Braidley (1792–1845), English writer